The 1946–47 Washington Capitols season was the inaugural season of the Washington Capitols in the Basketball Association of America (BAA). Their record was 49–11, owning the best overall record in the league.

Roster

Regular season

Season standings

Record vs. opponents

Game log

Playoffs

Semifinals

(E1) Washington Capitols vs. (W1) Chicago Stags: Stags win series 4-2
Game 1 @ Washington (April 2): Chicago 81, Washington 65
Game 2 @ Washington (April 3): Chicago 69, Washington 53
Game 3 @ Chicago (April 8): Chicago 67, Washington 55
Game 4 @ Washington (April 10): Washington 76, Chicago 69
Game 5 @ Chicago (April 12): Washington 67, Chicago 55
Game 6 @ Chicago (April 13): Chicago 66, Washington 61

Awards and records

Awards
Bob Feerick, All-BAA First Team
Bones McKinney, All-BAA First Team
Fred Scolari, All-BAA Second Team

References

Washington
Washington Capitols seasons
Washington
Washington